Block letters are a form of handwriting. It can also refer to:
 A style of business letter format.
 The letters at the start and finish of the serial number on a piece of U.S. currency, most commonly Federal Reserve Notes. Originally these letters were not actually letters, but rather a collection of elaborate symbols.
 A typeface or hand lettering having discrete sans-serif glyphs.